The 1924 Paul Quinn Tigers football team was an American football team that represented Paul Quinn College in the Southwestern Athletic Conference (SWAC) during the 1924 college football season. In their second season under head coach Harry Long, the team compiled a 6–0–3 record. The 1924 Paul Quinn team was recognized as the black college national champion. The team played its home games at Jackson Field in Waco, Texas.

Schedule

References

Paul Quinn
Paul Quinn Tigers football seasons
Black college football national champions
Southwestern Athletic Conference football champion seasons
College football undefeated seasons
Paul Quinn Tigers football